Philosophical Society of South Africa (PSSA) is a professional association of philosophers which aims to represent "the interests of the academic philosophical community in Southern Africa." It publishes South African Journal of Philosophy.

Controversy
The society became controversial in 2017 due to allegations of racism.

References

External links
Official website

Philosophical societies
African philosophy